Golden Lotus Award for Best Director is one of the Golden Lotus Awards presented by the Macau Film and Television Media Association and China International Cultural Communication Center to directors working in the motion picture industry.

Award winners and nominees

2000s

2009 (1st)

2010s

2010 (2nd)

2011 (3rd)

2012 (4th)

2013 (5th)

2014 (6th)

2015 (7th)

2016 (8th)

2017 (9th)

References

External links

Golden Lotus Awards
Awards for best director
Awards established in 2009
2009 establishments in Macau